2013 World Masters Athletics Championships is the 20th in a series of World Masters Athletics Outdoor Championships
that took place in Porto Alegre, Brazil from 16 to 27 October 2013.

The main venue was Centro Estadual de Treinamento Esportivo (CETE),

which had a newly laid track.

Supplemental venues included Estádio Universitário da PUCRS at Pontifical Catholic University of Rio Grande do Sul (PUCRS), Universidade Federal do Rio Grande do Sul (UFRGS), Sociedade de Ginástica Porto Alegre (SOGIPA).

Non-stadia road races were held at Parque Marinha do Brasil and Orla do Guaíba.

This Championships was organized by World Masters Athletics (WMA) in coordination with a Local Organising Committee (LOC): Estate of Rio Grande Do Sul, City Hall of Porto Alegre, ABRAM (Brazilian Association of Athletics Master) - Francisco Hypolito da Silveira and Group AUSTRAL - Vinicius Garcia.

The WMA is the global governing body of the sport of athletics for athletes 35 years of age or older, setting rules for masters athletics competition.

In addition to a full range of track and field events,

non-stadia events included 8K Cross Country, 10K Race Walk, 20K Race Walk, Half Marathon and Marathon.

Results
Official results are archived at wma2013.

Past Championships results are archived at WMA;

the 2013 results are available as a searchable pdf.

Additional archives are available from British Masters Athletic Federation

in several searchable pdf files

and from Museum of Masters Track & Field

as a searchable pdf.

Masters world records set at this Championships are listed below. New to the outdoor Championships series is the Half Marathon;

therefore all age-group winners set new world records for this event.

Women

Men

References

External links

World Masters Athletics Championships
World Masters Athletics Championships
International athletics competitions hosted by Brazil
World Masters Athletics Championships
Masters athletics (track and field) records